This is a list of aviation-related events from 1934:

Events
 Sir Alan Cobhams Flight Refuelling Ltd. develops the looped-hose aerial refueling system, a weighted cable let out of a tanker aircraft and grabbed by a grapnel fired from the receiving aircraft. It is the first practical aerial refueling system, and will not be replaced until the probe-and-drogue system is perfected in 1945.
 At Yokosuka, Japan, the Imperial Japanese Army and Imperial Japanese Navy hold the first of three annual interservice competitions in air combat techniques.
 The Mitsubishi Aircraft Company Ltd. is merged back into its parent company, Mitsubishi Heavy Industries.

January
They also set a new speed record for this crossing of 24 hours 35 minutes.
January 15 – On the final leg of a flight that began on 5 January in Saigon, French Indochina – with stops at Karachi, British India; Baghdad, Iraq; Marseille, France; and Lyons, France – the Air France Dewoitine D.332 Emeraude (registration F-AMMY) strikes a hill and crashes in a snowstorm at Corbigny, France, while flying from Lyons to Paris–Le Bourget Airport outside Paris, killing all ten people on board.
The 7-hour 14-minute flight – during which the balloon travels (  from its launch site – ends in tragedy when the crew loses control of the balloon during its descent and the gondola disintegrates and crashes near the village of Potizh-Ostrog in Insarsky District of Mordovian Autonomous Oblast in the Soviet Union, killing the crew.

February
 February 1 – South African Airways is founded.
 February 3 – Deutsche Luft Hansa begins the first regular airmail service across the Atlantic Ocean, between Berlin and Rio de Janeiro.
 February 7
 The first airmail flight between Australia and New Zealand is made by Charles Ulm in an Avro Ten, taking 14 hours 10 minutes.
 Germany begins a regular air mail service between Africa and South America, employing Dornier flying boats catapulted from depot ships. Dornier Do 26s will later fly the route without the assistance of ships, and various Dornier flying boats will complete over 300 crossings before the outbreak of World War II brings the service to an end in 1939.
 February 9 – President Franklin D. Roosevelt suspends all U.S. Air Mail contracts due to alleged improprieties by the Hoover Administration during the negotiations of those contracts.
 February 18 – The American World War I ace Eddie Rickenbacker and a Transcontinental & Western Air team including Jack Frye, "Tommy" Tomlinson, Larry Fritz, Paul E. Richter, Si Morehouse, Harlan Hull, John Collings, and Andy Andrews, set a new record for a transcontinental flight across the United States, flying the Douglas DC-1 from Burbank, California, to Newark, New Jersey, in 13 hours 4 minutes.
 February 19 – The United States Army Air Corps begins flying U.S. airmail in the wake of President Roosevelts cancellation of all U.S. Air Mail contracts.
 February 26 – In the first week of U.S. Army Air Corps delivery of U.S. Air Mail, five Army aviators have been killed in accidents. The death rate highlights the lack of training of most U.S. Army pilots in night and bad-weather flying.

March
 March 7 – Juan de la Cierva lands an autogyro on the Spanish Navy aviation ship Dédalo. It is the first time an autogyro lands on a Spanish ship.
 March 9 – All air operations of the United States Customs Service are transferred to the United States Coast Guard.
 March 22
The wreckage of the Pan American-Grace Airways (Panagra) Ford 5-AT-C Trimotor San José (registration NC403H) – which had crashed on Chile's Cerro El Plomo in the  Andes Mountains during a severe snowstorm on 16 July 1932, killing all nine people on board, and subsequently been buried in ice and snow – finally is discovered.
The Panagra Ford 5-AT-C Trimotor NC407H suffers engine failure and crashes on takeoff at Lima-Callao International Airport at Lima, Peru, killing three of the 15 people on board.

April
 Six Soviet and two American airmen rescue the crew of the Soviet commercial icebreaker Chelyuskin from the ice of the Chukchi Sea, where the ship had sunk on February 13.

May
 May 7 – U.S. Army Air Corps delivery of U.S. Air Mail comes to an end. During the 78 days of delivering air mail, 12 Army air crew have died in 66 accidents. The losses convince U.S. Army officials of the need to train their pilots in flying at night and in bad weather.
 May 8–23 – Jean Batten sets a new womens speed record between England and Australia. She flies a de Havilland DH.60 and makes the trip in 14 days 22 hours.
 May 9 – An Air France Wibault 282T-12 airliner crashes into the English Channel off Dungeness, Kent, England, killing all six people on board.
 May 18 – The Douglas DC-2 – production version of the Douglas DC-1 and forerunner of the Douglas DC-3 – enters commercial service, flying for Transcontinental and Western Air on the Columbus, Ohio–Pittsburgh–Newark route.
 May 19 – The largest heavier-than-air aircraft built anywhere in the 1930s, the 63 meter wingspan, 42 tonne takeoff weight, Andrei Tupolev-designed ANT-20 Maksim Gorki, makes its first flight in the Soviet Union. 
 May 28 – French Couzinet 71 flying boats begin the first regular air mail service across the South Atlantic Ocean.
 May 29 – Highland Airways commences the first regular airmail service within the United Kingdom, between Inverness and Kirkwall

June
 June 4 – The U.S. Navy commissions its first purpose-built aircraft carrier, .
 June 8 – A professional baseball team travels by air for the first time, when the Cincinnati Reds of the National League fly in a chartered Douglas DC-2 from Cincinnati to Chicago to play the Chicago Cubs.
 June 11 – During a flight from Santiago, Chile, to Buenos Aires, Argentina, the Pan American-Grace Airways (Panagra) Ford 5-AT-C Trimotor NC8417 crashes into Argentina's Mar Chiquita Lake during a heavy rainstorm, killing six of the ten people on board.
 June 12 – In the United States, the Air Mail Act of 1934 closely regulates the contracting of air mail services and prohibits aircraft manufacturers from owning airlines.
 June 23 – The U.S. Army takes delivery of its first six Link Trainers, giving birth to the flight simulator industry.
 June 24 – Airplane designer and racer Jimmie Wedell and his passenger die when the de Havilland Gypsy Moth he is piloting crashes at Patterson, Louisiana.
 June 26 – The initial flight of the Focke-Wulf Fw 61, the first practical helicopter, takes place.
 June 29–30 – Brothers Benjamin and Joseph Adamowicz, amateur pilots, fly across the Atlantic Ocean.

July
 July 2 – The Armée de l'Air is separated from the French Army to become the independent French Air Force, although retaining the name Armée de l'Air.
 July 15 – Varney Speed Lines (later to be Continental Airlines) makes its first passenger-carrying flight.
 July 19 – F9C Sparrowhawk parasite fighters from the United States Navy airship  successfully launch from the airship, scout out the heavy cruiser , and return to Macon.
 July 19-August 20 – United States Army Air Corps General Henry Arnold leads ten Martin B-10 bombers on an 8,000-mile (12,882-km) proving flight.
 July 26 – United States Army Air Corps Major William E. Kepner, Captain Albert W. Stevens, and Captain Orvil A. Anderson make the "National Geographic Society–U.S. Army Air Corps Stratosphere Flight" in the balloon Explorer in an attempt to set a new world altitude record for human flight. Launching from a depression that becomes known as the "Stratobowl" in Moonlight Valley in the Black Hills near Rapid City, South Dakota, they reach about  – about  short of the record – before a tear in the balloon forces them to descend over central Nebraska. Eventually, half the gas bag tears away, and they decide to bail out as the balloon passes  in a dangerously rapid descent.
It crashes in a forest near Wurmlingen in Tuttlingen, Germany, and burns, killing all 12 people on board, including the first European female flight attendant Nelly Diener. It is the deadliest civil aviation accident of 1934.

August
 The first National Air Meet for Women takes place at Dayton, Ohio. During a 50-mile (80-km) individual race, aviation record-holder Frances Marsalis dies in a crash at age 29.
 The Italian Fascist government merges the airlines Società Aerea Mediterranea (SAM), Società Anonima Navigazione Aerea (SANA), Società Italiana Servizi Aerei (SISA), and Aero Espresso Italiana (AEI) to create the new airline Ala Littoria as the national airline of Italy.
 August 8–9 – James Ayling and Len Reid make the first non-stop flight from Canada to England, in a de Havilland DH84, taking 30 hours 50 minutes for the flight.
 August 28-September 16 – The fourth and last International Tourist Aircraft Contest Challenge International de Tourisme 1934 takes place in Warsaw, Poland. The Polish crew of Jerzy Bajan on the RWD-9 plane wins.

September
 September 5 – While undergoing inflation with hydrogen gas in Moscow's Kuntsevo District for a planned September 24 ascent to set a new human fight altitude record, the Soviet balloon USSR-2 is destroyed by a fire ignited by a stray spark. The accident prompts the Soviet Union's People's Commissar of Defense, Kliment Voroshilov, to suspend the Soviet Union's high-altitude manned balloon program.
 September 7–16 – As part of Challenge International de Tourisme 1934, a  race takes place over Europe and North Africa, concluding with a maximum speed trial over a  triangular course on September 16.
 September 14 – The airline Aeronaves de México begins flight operations. Its first flight is from Mexico City to Acapulco, Mexico, using a Stinson SR Reliant. The airline will change its name to Aeroméxico in February 1972. 
 September 22
Sir Alan Cobham sets out in an Airspeed Courier in a failed attempt to fly non-stop from England to India.
Shortly after takeoff from Heston Airport in Hounslow, England, the Handley Page W.10 airliner G-EBMM, operated by National Aviation Displays, suffers a structural failure and crashes at Aston Clinton, killing all four people on board. 
 September 29 – A London, Scottish & Provincial Airways Airspeed Courier crashes at Timberden Bottom, Shoreham, Kent, in the United Kingdom, killing all four people on board. Flying debris injures two people on the ground.

October
 The Japan Aeroplane Company Ltd. is founded, with plants at Yokohama and Yamagata, Japan.
 The Government of the Philippines passes an act to regulate foreign aircraft operations in the Philippines an to require a franchise from the Philippine government in order to operate an air service in the Philippines.
 October 2 – A Hillman's Airways de Havilland DH.89A Dragon Rapide crashes into the English Channel off Folkestone, Kent, England, in poor visibility, killing all seven people on board.
 October 8 – Inter-Island Airways makes the first interisland air mail flight in the Hawaiian Islands under a United States Post Office contract.
 October 14 – National Airlines begins operations, using two second-hand Ryan ST monoplanes to fly a mail contract service in Florida between St. Petersburg and Daytona Beach with stops at Tampa, Lakeland, and Orlando.
 October 19 – The Holyman's Airways de Havilland DH.86 Express airliner Miss Hobart (registration VH-URN) crashes in the Bass Strait during a domestic flight in Australia from Melbourne, Victoria, to Launceston, Tasmania, killing all 11 people on board. Miss Hobart had just flown the new airline's first flight three weeks earlier, and one of its founders, Captain Victor Holyman, is among the dead.
 October 20-November 3 - Sir Charles Kingsford Smith makes the first eastward crossing of the Pacific Ocean, from Brisbane, Australia to San Francisco, in the Lady Southern Cross. The Hawaii-to-San Francisco leg of his crossing on November 3 is the first eastward flight from Hawaii to North America.
 October 20-November 5 - The MacRobertson Air Race is flown from England to Melbourne, Australia to celebrate the centenary of the state of Victoria. The £10,000 prize money is won by C. W. A. Scott and Tom Campbell Black flying de Havilland DH.88 Comet Grosvenor House from Mildenhall, Suffolk to Melbourne, Australia in a time of 71 hours.
 October 23
Again he flies the Italian Macchi M.C.72 seaplane.
The first licensed female balloon pilot in the United States, Jeannette Piccard retains control of the balloon for the entire flight, and the flight makes her the first woman to fly in the stratosphere.  
 October 26 – The only Pander S-4 Postjager is destroyed during the MacRobertson Air Race from London, England, to Melbourne, Australia, when it strikes a motor car and bursts into flames while taxiing for departure from Allahabad, India. Its crew escapes unharmed.

November
 The United States Congress passes an amendment to the Air Commerce Act of 1926 requiring U.S. airlines to use multi-engine aircraft on routes over terrain not readily permitting emergency landings.
 November 6 – The Deutsche Reichsbahn-Gesellschaft Junkers Ju 52/3mge D-AVAN, flying a domestic cargo flight in Germany from Königsberg Devau Airport in Königsberg, East Prussia, to Berlin Tempelhof Airport in Berlin, crashes while attempting an emergency landing at Gross-Rackitt in Pommern, killing all five people on board.
 November 11 – United States Army Air Corps Captains Albert W. Stevens and Orvil A. Anderson set a new world altitude record for human flight. Launching from a depression known as the "Stratobowl" in Moonlight Valley in the Black Hills near Rapid City, South Dakota, in the 316-foot- (96.3-meter-) tall balloon Explorer II, they reach , talking by radio from that height simultaneously with airline pilots flying to Hawaii and radio operators in London, before landing in southern South Dakota. Their altitude record for balloon flights will stand until June 2, 1957.
 November 15 – During a domestic flight in Australia from Longreach Airport, Queensland, to Archerfield Airport in Archerfield, Queensland – the final leg of its delivery flight from England to Australia – the Qantas de Havilland DH.86 Express VH-USG suffers an in-flight loss of control and crashes at Ilfracombe, killing all four people on board.
 November 30 – The record-setting French aviator Hélène Boucher dies when the Renault Viva Grand Sport she is piloting on a test flight crashes into the woods at Guyancourt, France.

December
 December 3 – Charles Ulm disappears while flying over the Pacific Ocean somewhere between Oakland, California and Hawaii.
 December 7 – The crash of a military Fairey Fox fighter-bomber starts a hangar fire at Haren Airport in Brussels, Belgium, that destroys at least two Sabena airliners.
 December 8 – Imperial Airways extends its airmail service to Australia.
 December 10 – During a domestic flight in Cuba from Rancho-Boyeros Airport in Havana to Antonio Maceo Airport in Santiago de Cuba, the Cubana de Aviación Ford 4-AT-E Tri-Motor NM-7 crashes into a mountain near Palma Soriano during heavy rain, killing four of the eight people on board.
 December 20
During a flight from Almaza Airport outside Cairo, Egypt, to Baghdad, Iraq – one leg of a Christmas mail-and-passenger flight from Schiphol Airport in Amsterdam, the Netherlands, to Batavia in the Netherlands East Indies which prior to Cairo had made stops in Marseille, France; Rome, Italy; and Athens, Greece – the KLM Royal Dutch Airlines Douglas DC-2-115A Uiver (registration PH-AJU) crashes near Rutbah Wells, Iraq, during a rainstorm and bursts into flames, killing all seven people on board.
United Airlines Flight 6, a Boeing 247, loses power in both engines shortly after takeoff from Chicago. The three-man crew manages to crash-land the plane, and the entire crew and the lone passenger survive.
 December 28 – During the Chaco War, a Macchi M.18 flying boat of the Paraguayan Navys aviation arm carries out the first night bombing raid in South America, attacking Bolivian positions at Vitriones and Mbutum.
 c. December 29 – An American Airlines Curtiss T-32 Condor II crashes in the Adirondack Mountains; all four on board survive.
 December 31 – Helen Richey becomes the first woman to pilot a regular civil flight, taking a Central Airlines Ford Trimotor on the Washington, D.C. to Detroit route; however, she gets few subsequent flights.

First flights
 Aichi D1A
 Avro 641 Commodore
 Avro 642 Eighteen
 Bellanca 77-140
 Farman F.271
 Farman F.400
 Farman F.430
 Granville Gee Bee R-6
 Miles Hawk Major
 Nakajima Ki-8
 Nakajima Ki-11
 Piaggio P.16
 Westland F.7/30/PV.4
 Early 1934 – Arado Ar 68
 Summer 1934 – Henschel Hs 125

January
 January 4 – Henschel Hs 121
 January 7 – Curtiss XF13C-1
 January 14 – de Havilland DH.86 Express
 January 16 – Northrop XFT-1
 January 20 – Boeing XP-940/P-29
 January 23 – Berliner-Joyce XF3J-1
 January 30 – Junkers Ju 160

February
 Gotha Go 145
 Kawasaki Ki-5
 19 February - Supermarine Type 224
 22 February - Fairey S.9/30

March
 Nakajima E8N
 Saro London
 March 30 - Potez 58
 March 30 - Sikorsky S-42

April
 Curtiss SOC
 Mitsubishi Ka-9, forerunner of the Ka-15 prototype for the Mitsubishi G3M
 April 17
 de Havilland DH.89 Dragon Rapide
 Fairey Swordfish
 April 27 – Stinson Model A
 April 28 – Hamburger Flugzeugbau Ha 135

May
 Nakajima Ki-4
 May 9 - de Havilland DH.87 Hornet Moth
 May 11 - Douglas DC-2
 May 19 - Tupolev ANT-20 Maksim Gorky

June
 June 18
 Farman F.420
 Potez 56
 June 26 – Airspeed Envoy

July
 July 27 - Supermarine Stranraer

August
 Amiot 143
 Mitsubishi B4M
 PZL.23 Karas
 August 14 - Dewoitine D.510

September
 September 1
Bellanca 28-70
Polikarpov I-17
 September 7 – Hawker Hardy
 September 8 – de Havilland DH.88 Comet
 September 12
Gloster Gladiator
Hawker Hind
 September 28 – Savoia-Marchetti SM.79 Sparviero

October
 Caudron Simoun C620
 October 7 -  Tupolev ANT-40RT, forerunner to the Tupolev SB
 October 12 – Miles M.3 Falcon
 October 15 - Grumman XF3F-1
 October 31 – Fairchild Super 71

November
 November 4 – Junkers Ju 86
 November 16 – Savoia-Marchetti S.74
 November 23
Bloch MB.210
Dornier Do 17

December
 Aichi E10A

Entered service
 Avro 671 Rota with the Royal Air Force
 Beriev MBR-2 with Soviet Naval Aviation (NATO reporting name "Mote")
 Beriev MP-1 in airliner service
 Cierva C.30
 Latécoère 290 with two squadrons of French Naval Aviation
 Polikarpov I-15 with the Soviet Air Force
 Potez 39 with the French Air Force
 PZL P.11a with the Polish Air Force
 PZL P.11b with the Romanian Air Force

January
 Consolidated P-30 (later PB-2) with the United States Army Air Corps

April
 April 6 – Avro 642 Eighteen with Midland & Scottish Air Ferries Ltd

May
 Couzinet 71 with Aéropostale
 Grumman JF Duck with the United States Navy at Naval Air Station Norfolk, Virginia
 Polikarpov I-16 with the Soviet Air Force
 May 18 – Douglas DC-2 with Transcontinental and Western Air
 May 24 – Avro 641 Commodore with private owner

November
 November 25 – Potez 540 with the French Air Force

Retirements
 Avro 654, formerly the Avro 627 Mailplane
 Boeing 80 by United Airlines

January
 Handley Page Hyderabad by the Royal Air Force's No. 503 Squadron

December
 Cierva C.24

References

External links
Tom Campbell Black
75th. Anniversary of the Great Air Race October 1934 Tom Campbell Black

 
Aviation by year